Berlin Township is a township in Camden County, in the U.S. state of New Jersey. As of the 2020 United States census, the township's population was 5,867, an increase of 510 (+9.5%) from the 2010 census count of 5,357, which in turn reflected an increase of 67 (+1.3%) from the 5,290 counted in the 2000 census.

History
Berlin was incorporated as a township on April 11, 1910, from portions of Waterford Township. Portions of the township were taken on March 29, 1927, to form Berlin Borough, based on the results of a referendum held on April 26, 1927. The township was named for the city of Berlin, Germany.

After a majority of residents supported the change, the township voted to assign all Berlin Township residents the common ZIP code of 08091 for West Berlin starting in February 1995, ending a system in which some township residents had been served by post offices in Atco and Berlin.

Geography
According to the United States Census Bureau, the township had a total area of 3.35 square miles (8.67 km2), including 3.34 square miles (8.66 km2) of land and 0.01 square miles (0.02 km2) of water (0.18%).

The township borders the municipalities of Berlin Borough, Lindenwold, Voorhees Township, and Waterford Township in Camden County; and Evesham Township in Burlington County.

Crow Foot, Reed Crossing and West Berlin are unincorporated communities located within the township.

The township is one of 56 South Jersey municipalities that are included within the New Jersey Pinelands National Reserve, a protected natural area of unique ecology covering , that has been classified as a United States Biosphere Reserve and established by Congress in 1978 as the nation's first National Reserve. Part of the borough is included in the state-designated Pinelands Area, which includes portions of Camden County, along with areas in Atlantic, Burlington, Cape May, Cumberland, Gloucester and Ocean counties.

Demographics

2010 census

The Census Bureau's 2006–2010 American Community Survey showed that (in 2010 inflation-adjusted dollars) median household income was $61,029 (with a margin of error of +/− $8,347) and the median family income was $70,777 (+/− $6,678). Males had a median income of $50,286 (+/− $4,262) versus $41,250 (+/− $8,550) for females. The per capita income for the borough was $26,184 (+/− $2,541). About 4.6% of families and 5.6% of the population were below the poverty line, including 8.0% of those under age 18 and 1.3% of those age 65 or over.

2000 census 2000
As of the 2000 United States census there were 5,290 people, 1,893 households, and 1,368 families residing in the township. The racial makeup of the township was 82.46% White, 11.87% African American, 0.17% Native American, 2.70% Asian, 0.08% Pacific Islander, 1.21% from other races, and 1.51% from two or more races. Hispanic or Latino of any race were 4.80% of the population.

There were 1,893 households, out of which 34.5% had children under the age of 18 living with them, 55.1% were married couples living together, 12.3% had a female householder with no husband present, and 27.7% were non-families. 22.6% of all households were made up of individuals, and 11.0% had someone living alone who was 65 years of age or older. The average household size was 2.78 and the average family size was 3.28.

In the township the population was spread out, with 25.8% under the age of 18, 8.5% from 18 to 24, 30.3% from 25 to 44, 22.9% from 45 to 64, and 12.5% who were 65 years of age or older. The median age was 36 years. For every 100 females, there were 99.0 males.  For every 100 females age 18 and over, there were 95.3 males.

The median income for a household in the township was $54,448, and the median income for a family was $61,042. Males had a median income of $37,240 versus $28,703 for females. The per capita income for the township was $22,178. About 4.8% of families and 5.9% of the population were below the poverty line, including 5.6% of those under age 18 and 6.7% of those age 65 or over.

Government

Local government
In 1973, Berlin Township changed its form of government from the Township form to a Faulkner Act Small Municipality form, and now operates under plan 3 of the Small Municipality form, as implemented on January 1, 1988, by direct petition. The township is one of 18 municipalities (of the 564) statewide that use this form of government, which is available only to municipalities with fewer than 12,000 residents at the time of adoption. The governing body is comprised of four Council members and the Mayor, all elected at-large. The mayor serves a four-year term of office and the councilmembers serve a three-year term, with two council seats coming up for election each year for two years and no council seats up for vote in the third year of the cycle. The candidates run in partisan elections at regular primary and are elected at the November general election. Independent candidates, having declared their intentions at primary time, run only in the general election.

This type of government is a strong mayor form in which the Mayor, as chief executive, is responsible for all administrative functions. The Mayor presides at Council meetings, voting and participating as a member of Council. The Mayor appoints, with Council's approval, the following: Tax Assessor, Tax Collector, Clerk, Treasurer, Zoning Officer, Construction Official, Court Administrator, Attorney and Engineer. The Mayor is responsible for the budget; enforcing the charter (State law) and all ordinances (local laws), and the preparation of an annual report for the Council and residents. The Council has legislative and policy-making power. It elects a Council President annually to preside in the Mayor's absence. The Mayor appoints Council members to serve as liaisons to the Recreation Committee, Finance Committee, Athletic Association, Public Works, Special Events, School Board, Public Safety and Senior Citizens. The Mayor and one council member are members of the Planning and Zoning Board.

, the Mayor of Berlin Township is Democrat Phyllis A. Jeffries Magazzu, whose term of office ends December 31, 2025. Members of the Township Council are Council President Marion Bodanza (D, 2022), Frank Epifanio (D, 2024), Francis McHenry (D, 2022; appointed to serve an unexpired term) and Mark Reid (D, 2024).

In February 2022, the Township Council selected Francis McHenry from a list of three candidates nominated by the Democratic municipal committee to fill the seat expiring in December 2022 that had been held by Christopher Morris until he resigned from office earlier that month.

In November 2019, Samuel D. Sykes was elected to fill a vacant seat on the Township Council expiring In December 2021. that had been held by Jerome McIntosh until his death in July 2019.

Federal, state and county representation
Berlin Township is located in the 1st Congressional District and is part of New Jersey's 6th state legislative district.

Politics
As of March 2011, there were a total of 3,449 registered voters in Berlin Township, of which 1,552 (45.0% vs. 31.7% countywide) were registered as Democrats, 370 (10.7% vs. 21.1%) were registered as Republicans and 1,524 (44.2% vs. 47.1%) were registered as Unaffiliated. There were 3 voters registered as Libertarians or Greens. Among the township's 2010 Census population, 64.4% (vs. 57.1% in Camden County) were registered to vote, including 82.9% of those ages 18 and over (vs. 73.7% countywide).

In the 2012 presidential election, Democrat Barack Obama received 1,502 votes (63.9% vs. 54.8% countywide), ahead of Republican Mitt Romney with 814 votes (34.6% vs. 43.5%) and other candidates with 19 votes (0.8% vs. 0.9%), among the 2,351 ballots cast by the township's 3,686 registered voters, for a turnout of 63.8% (vs. 70.4% in Camden County). In the 2008 presidential election, Democrat Barack Obama received 1,519 votes (62.4% vs. 66.2% countywide), ahead of Republican John McCain with 829 votes (34.1% vs. 30.7%) and other candidates with 32 votes (1.3% vs. 1.1%), among the 2,434 ballots cast by the township's 3,478 registered voters, for a turnout of 70.0% (vs. 71.4% in Camden County). In the 2004 presidential election, Democrat John Kerry received 1,305 votes (56.6% vs. 61.7% countywide), ahead of Republican George W. Bush with 876 votes (38.0% vs. 36.4%) and other candidates with 23 votes (1.0% vs. 0.8%), among the 2,304 ballots cast by the township's 3,123 registered voters, for a turnout of 73.8% (vs. 71.3% in the whole county).

In the 2013 gubernatorial election, Republican Chris Christie received 60.0% of the vote (848 cast), ahead of Democrat Barbara Buono with 39.2% (554 votes), and other candidates with 0.8% (12 votes), among the 1,515 ballots cast by the township's 3,752 registered voters (101 ballots were spoiled), for a turnout of 40.4%. In the 2009 gubernatorial election, Democrat Jon Corzine received 857 ballots cast (51.0% vs. 53.8% countywide), ahead of Republican Chris Christie with 650 votes (38.7% vs. 38.5%), Independent Chris Daggett with 73 votes (4.3% vs. 4.5%) and other candidates with 29 votes (1.7% vs. 1.1%), among the 1,681 ballots cast by the township's 3,428 registered voters, yielding a 49.0% turnout (vs. 40.8% in the county).

Education
The Berlin Township Public Schools serve students in pre-kindergarten through eighth grade. As of the 2020–21 school year, the district, comprised of two schools, had an enrollment of 609 students and 55.1 classroom teachers (on an FTE basis), for a student–teacher ratio of 11.1:1. Schools in the district (with 2020–2021 enrollment data from the National Center for Education Statistics) are 
John F. Kennedy Elementary School with 279 students in Pre-K through 3rd grade and 
Dwight D. Eisenhower Middle School with 325 students in grades 4–8. The Huster Building, formerly used as a kindergarten and now used for administration, is named after Robert R. Huster, a Berlin Township resident who was killed in action on April 8, 1967, during the Vietnam War.

Public school students in ninth through twelfth grades from Berlin Township and Clementon attend Overbrook High School in Pine Hill as part of a sending/receiving relationship with the Pine Hill Schools. A representative from Berlin Township serves on the board of education of the Pine Hill Schools. As of the 2020–21 school year, the high school had an enrollment of 657 students and 61.6 classroom teachers (on an FTE basis), for a student–teacher ratio of 10.7:1.

Students from Berlin Township, and from all of Camden County, are eligible to attend the Camden County Technical Schools, a countywide public school district that serves the vocational and technical education needs of students at the high school and post-secondary level at the Gloucester Township Campus in the Sicklerville section of Gloucester Township or the Pennsauken Campus in Pennsauken Township. Students are accepted based on district admission standards and costs of attendance and transportation are covered by the home district of each student.

Transportation

Roads and highways 

Route 73 is the main highway serving Berlin Township. County Route 534 and County Route 561 also pass through the township. Berlin Township formerly contained the Berlin Circle.

Public transportation 
NJ Transit bus service is available in the borough on the 406 route, which operates between Berlin Township and Philadelphia.

Notable people
People who were born in, residents of, or otherwise closely associated with Berlin Township include:

 Damien Covington (1972–2002), linebacker who played for three seasons for the Buffalo Bills
 Sarah Dawson (born 1992), field hockey forward / midfielder who represented the United States at the 2012 Summer Olympics in Beijing
 Ron Dayne (born 1978), running back for the Houston Texans

References

External links

Berlin Township municipal website
Berlin Township Public Schools

School Data for the Berlin Township Public Schools, National Center for Education Statistics

 
1910 establishments in New Jersey
Faulkner Act (small municipality)
Populated places established in 1910
Townships in Camden County, New Jersey